Vitthal Ramji Shinde (23 April 1873 – 2 January 1944) was a social and religious reformer in Maharashtra, India. He was prominent among the liberal thinkers and reformists in India, prior to its independence. He has been recognised as a social reformer and an activist fighting for greater equality in Indian society.  He is particularly noted for opposing the practice of 'untouchability', and for championing support and education for 'untouchables', such as Dalits.

Early life
He was born on 23 April 1873 in the princely state of Jamkhandi in Karnataka, India, a member of a Marathi-speaking family of Maratha origin. His early childhood was influenced by a liberal family environment. The family friends and acquaintances came from all religions and castes. He was brought up to think that religion was not just a matter of a blind faith and meaningless rituals or pujas, but meant getting personally and emotionally involved in the service of God.

His early spiritual awakening came from his reading of Sant Tukaram, Sant Eknath and Sant Ramdas of Maharashtra.

His intellectual awakening was influenced by the writings of many intellectuals such as Hari Narayan Apte, Principal Gopal Ganesh Agarkar, John Stuart Mill, Herbert Spencer and Max Müller, Chief Justice Mahadev Govind Ranade and Sir R. G. Bhandarkar.

Education
In 1898 he obtained a Bachelor of Arts degree from the Fergusson College at Pune, India. He had also studied and passed the first year law and moved to Mumbai (Bombay) for the LL.B. examination; however, he gave up this course to attend to other compelling callings in his life. This same year he joined the Prarthana Samaj, where he was further inspired and influenced by G.B. Kotkar, Shivrampant Gokhale, Justice Mahadev Govinda Ranade, Sir Ramakrishna Gopal Bhandarkar and K.B. Marathe. He became a missionary for the Prarthana Samaj.

The Prarthana Samaj selected him to go to England in 1901, to study comparative religion at Manchester College, Oxford. Maharaja Sayajirao Gaekwad III, of Baroda, a progressive and reformist, provided some financial help for his travels abroad.

Adult life
After returning from England in 1903, he devoted his life to religious and social reforms. He continued his missionary work for the Prarthana Samaj . His efforts were devoted mainly to the removal of untouchability in India.In 1905 he established a night school for the children of untouchables in Pune, and in 1906 he established the Depressed Classes Mission in (Bombay). Also in 1910 he founded Murali Pratibandhak Sabha, and in 1912 organised  a "Asprushata Niwaran Parishad". In 1922, the mission's Ahalyashram building was completed at Pune. In 1917 he succeeded in getting the Indian National Congress to pass a resolution condemning the practice of untouchability.

From 1918 to 1920, he went on to convening all the India untouchability removal conferences. Some of these conferences were convened under the president-ship of Mahatma Gandhi and Maharaja Sahyajirao Gaekwad .His written communications with the Mahatmaji are noteworthy .In 1919 he gave evidence before the Southborough Franchise Committee, asking for the special representation for the untouchable castes. In 1923 he resigned as the executive of the Depressed Classes Mission since some of the members of the untouchable castes wanted its own leaders to manage the mission's affairs .His work and association with the Mission continued even though he was disappointed by the separatist attitude of the leaders of the untouchables, especially under the leadership of Dr. B.R. Ambedkar. Like Mahatma Gandhi, he wanted unity amongst the untouchables and the Hindu caste, and feared that the British rule would take advantage of such divisions within Indian society and exploit them for their own benefit.
 
In 1930 he participated in the Civil Disobedience movement of Mahatma Gandhi and was imprisoned for six months of hard labor, in the Yerawda Central Jail (prison) near Pune.

In 1933 his book Bhartiya Asprushyatecha Prashna ("India’s untouchability question") was published .His thoughts and examination of the Hindu religion and social culture were similar to Dayananda Saraswati . In his writings, he opposes the caste system, idol worship, and inequities against women and depressed classes. He opposed meaningless rituals, the dominance of hereditary priesthood, and the requirement of a priest to mediate between God and his devotees.

Maharshi Vitthal Ramji Shinde died on 2 January 1944.

Depressed Class Mission 

Shinde was a prominent campaigner on behalf of the Dalit movement in India who established the Depressed Classes Mission of India to provide education to the Dalits. He laid the foundation of Depressed Class Mission on 18 October 1906 in order to work against untouchability on the national level. Aims of this mission were:
To try to get rid of untouchability.
To provide educational facilities to the untouchables.
To start schools, hostels, and hospitals for the untouchables.
To solve their social problems.

References

Dr. G.M. Pawar, English translation by Sudhakar Marathe "The life and work of Maharshi Vitthal Ramji Shinde, Sahitya Academi 2013,  
Gore, M.S.; Vitthal Ramji Shinde, An Assessment of his Contribution (book in English language), (1989), Tata Institute of Social Sciences, Bombay, India.
Pawar, G.M.; Maharshi Vitthal Ramji Shinde, Jeevan wa Karya (book in Marathi language), (2004), Mumbai (Bombay), India. .
Katare.maharashtra history (2013) edition

1873 births
1944 deaths
Dalit activists
People from Jamakhandi
Activists from Maharashtra
Activists from Karnataka
19th-century Indian people
Prarthana Samaj
Dalit saints
Dalit Hindu saints